Tempe High School is a government-funded co-educational dual modality partially academically selective and comprehensive secondary day school, located in Tempe, an inner-western suburb of Sydney, New South Wales, Australia.

A 2004 proposal failed to combine Tempe, Dulwich Hill, Marrickville and Newtown high schools into a multi-campus college due to falling enrolments. Instead, from 2005 the school became partially selective offering places based on academic performance as well as accepting local students.

Notable alumni 
Tim CahillSoccer Player (disputed)
 Col JoyeEntertainer
 Bob SimpsonCricketer 
 Anba SurielCoptic Orthodox Bishop

See also

 List of government schools in New South Wales
 List of selective high schools in New South Wales

References

External links 
 Tempe High School website

Public high schools in Sydney
1814 establishments in Australia
Educational institutions established in 1814
Selective schools in New South Wales
Tempe, New South Wales